Sabak is a state constituency in Selangor, Malaysia, that has been represented in the Selangor State Legislative Assembly since 1959.

The state constituency was created in the 1958 redistribution and elects a single member under the first-past-the-post system. , the State Assemblyman for Sabak is Ahmad Mustain Othman from Parti Keadilan Rakyat (PKR).

Demographics

History

Polling districts 
According to the gazette issued on 30 March 2018, the Sabak constituency has a total of 17 polling districts.

Representation history

Election results

References

Selangor state constituencies